The province of Taranto (), previously known as the province of the Ionian, is a province in the Apulia region of Italy. Its capital is the city of Taranto. There are 29 comuni (singular: comune) in the province, all of which are listed at comunes of the Province of Taranto. The coat of arms of the province contains a scorpion, which Pyrrhus is thought to have seen when looking down at Taranto.

History

When Italy was unified, the province of Lecce was formed; the western section of this later became the current province of Taranto. On 23 September 1923, Taranto became the capital of a new province based on the ancient Terra d'Otranto, in recognition of the important role the city had served since ancient times. Until 1951, the new province was called the "Province of the Ionian".

The scorpion on the city's coat of arms may have been used as its emblem in ancient times, on the suggestion of Pyrrhus of Epirus, who was an ally of Taranto in a war against Rome: the scorpion is shown lying on its back with three lilies, holding the crown of the Principality of Taranto between its claws. Pyrrhus, who was king of Epirus, looked down on the city from the hills that surround it and had the idea that its shape was like the figure of a scorpion. This emblem has also been seen as a psychological deterrent to the city's enemies, who came to look on Magna Graecia as being as dangerous as a scorpion. The earliest verified use of a scorpion on the coat of arms of Taranto is from 400 AD.

References

External links
Official website
Tourism in the province of Taranto